Snovik is a small settlement in the Tuhinj Valley in the Municipality of Kamnik in the Upper Carniola region of Slovenia.

Based on evidence from medieval sources, the name Snovik is derived from *Jesenovik 'ash grove'.

The recently developed Snovik Spa is located near Snovik. It utilizes thermal water from the area with indoor and outdoor pools and offers a range of health programs, recreational activities, and accommodation.

References

External links
Snovik on Geopedia
Snovik Spa site

Populated places in the Municipality of Kamnik
Spa towns in Slovenia